The 2022 Malaysia FA Cup was the 32nd edition of the Malaysia FA Cup, a knockout competition for Malaysian association football clubs. The winners, if eligible, would be assured a place in the 2023–24 AFC Cup group stage. 34 teams entered the competition.

Kedah Darul Aman were the defending champions after winning the 2019 Malaysia FA Cup. The 2020 edition was abandoned midway during the tournament, and the 2021 edition was not played, both due to the COVID-19 pandemic in Malaysia.

Qualified teams
The following teams played in the competition. Reserve teams were excluded.

Round and draw dates

Preliminary 
Key: (1) = Super League; (2) = Premier League; (3) = Liga M3

The draw for the preliminary round was held on 23 February 2022. The matches were held on 6 March.

First round

Key: (1) = Super League; (2) = Premier League; (3) = Liga M3

The draw for the first round was held on 23 February 2022. The matches were held between 11 March and 29 April.

Second round

Key: (1) = Super League; (2) = Premier League; (3) = Liga M3

The draw for the second round was held on 20 April 2022. The matches were held between 13 May and 8 July.

Knockout round

Bracket

Quarter-finals

Semi-finals

Final

Top goalscorers

See also 
 2022 Malaysia Super League
 2022 Malaysia Premier League
 2022 Malaysia M3 League

References

External links
 Football Malaysia LLP website - Piala FA
 Result Reports 

Piala FA seasons
Malaysia
FA Cup